Ploudalmézeau is a commune in the Finistère department of Brittany in north-western France.

The village and small port of Portsall is part of the commune. Portsall is known for the Amoco Cadiz oil spill.

Geography

Climate
Ploudalmézeau has an oceanic climate (Köppen climate classification Cfb).

International relations
It is twinned with Cullompton, Devon.

Population
Inhabitants of Ploudalmézeau are called in French Ploudalméziens.

Breton language
In 2008, 11.69% of primary-school children attended bilingual schools, where Breton language is taught alongside French.

Amoco Cadiz oil spill

On 16 March 1978, Amoco Cadiz, a very large crude carrier (VLCC), owned by Amoco, split in three after running aground on Portsall Rocks, 5 km (3.1 mi) from the coast of Portsall, resulting in the largest oil spill of its kind in history to that date.

See also
Communes of the Finistère department
 Amoco Cadiz

References

External links

Official website 

Mayors of Finistère Association 

Communes of Finistère